Neduba carinata is a shield-backed katydid known only from Fremont Peak in San Benito County, California. This name has often been used to describe katydids across a broad portion of the western United States, but most of its subspecies have been elevated to species level, and as currently conceived it only applies to a population on Fremont Peak with a pronotum slightly longer and narrower than the similar N. diabloica.

References

Tettigoniinae
Insects described in 1869